STE, Ste, and Ste. may refer to:

Transportation
 Stockton Terminal and Eastern Railroad
 Stevens Point Municipal Airport, IATA code STE
 Streatham railway station, London, National Rail station code STE
 Servicio de Transportes Eléctricos, a large public transit authority in Mexico City
 Special Touring Edition, a model of the Pontiac 6000 automobile

Technology
 Secure Terminal Equipment
 Atari STE, an enhanced version of the Atari ST computer family
 STE-1, model number of the Shadow Telecine

Other uses
 Simplified Technical English
 Sigma Theta Epsilon
 Saint, Ste., forms the French abbreviation for Sainte, the feminine form 
 Star Trek: Enterprise, 2001–05 Star Trek TV series
 Suite (address), abbreviated "Ste" or "STE"
 Solar thermal energy
 Save the Elephants